26 Camelopardalis is a single star in the northern constellation of Camelopardalis, positioned next to the southern constellation boundary with Auriga. It is a suspected variable star that is dimly visible to the naked eye with a peak apparent visual magnitude of +5.93. This object is located at a distance of 197 light years from the Sun based on parallax, and is drifting further away with a radial velocity of +21 km/s.

This is a white-hued A-type main-sequence star with a stellar classification of A4Vn, where the 'n' notation indicates "nebulous" absorption lines due to rapid rotation. It is an estimated 345 million years old and is spinning with a projected rotational velocity of 249 km/s. The star has 1.80 times the mass of the Sun and is radiating 13 times the Sun's luminosity from its photosphere at an effective temperature of 7,798 K.

References

A-type main-sequence stars
Camelopardalis (constellation)
Durchmusterung objects
Camelopardalis, 26
038091
027249
1969